Malays played a significant role in pre-Hispanic Philippine history. Malay involvement in Philippine history goes back to the Classical Era with the establishment of Rajahnates as well as the Islamic era, in which various sultanates and Islamic states were formed in Mindanao, the Sulu Archipelago, and around Manila.

Malays made large contribution to Philippine history, and influenced modern-day lifestyles of Filipinos. The Malay language was the lingua franca of the archipelago prior to Spanish rule due to the religious history of the Malay Archipelago.

Although the modern Philippines does not have a huge majority or minority of Ethnic Malays today, (Filipinos who identified as Ethnic Malay make up 0.2% of the total population), the descendants of Ethnic Malays have been assimilated into the wider related Austronesian Filipino culture, characterized by Chinese and Spanish influence, and Roman Catholicism. Malay cultural influence is still strong in the culturally conservative regions of Mindanao, southern Palawan, the Sulu Archipelago, and to some extent in rural of the Visayas and Luzon, where much Malay involvement and intermixing came during the classical era.

In the modern day, the closest cultural population to Malays are the Moro peoples, the native Islamized populations of the Philippines that inhabit Mindanao, Sulu Archipelago, parts of Visayas and Metro Manila and its environs. They follow a culture and lifestyle somewhat similar to Malays (predominantly in dress code and religion), although this culturally differs in the areas that these groups follow traditions native to or unique to the Philippines, such as cuisine, traditional music, and language (which belong to the Visayan, Danao, and Sangiric branches of Philippine languages, and Sama-Bajaw languages).

There is an often a lot of confusion in the Philippines between "ethnic Malays" and "Malay race", a term coined for brown-skinned Austronesian natives of not only the Philippines, but also of Malaysia, Indonesia, Brunei, Singapore and southern Thailand. The country had its own Malay nationalism, un-associated with the anti-colonial struggle in the British and Dutch East Indies. The Philippine nationalism occurred towards the end of Spanish occupation and was spearheaded by José Rizal. Unlike the Malay nationalism and "Malayness" in Indonesia which was defined by the ethnic group, and in Malaysia which was defined by Islam as well as being of the ethnic group, Rizal's movement was that of a secular vision to unify the natives of the Malay Archipelago and the Malay Peninsula, believing them to have falsely been divided by colonial powers.

History

Interaction between the natives of the Philippines and the Malay Srivijaya Kingdom (as well as the Javanese kingdoms of Majapahit and Medang) are recorded by the Laguna Copperplate Inscription, which dates approximately 900 A.D. This steel plate was written in a mix of Old Tagalog, Old Malay and Javanese. Among the Malays, the classical Philippine kingdoms also interacted with other native peoples of Indonesia, including the Minangkabau and Javanese.

The first-recorded Malay in Philippine history was Sri Lumay, although accounts him are mostly in Visayan folklore. Sri Lumay was born in Sumatra, an island in Indonesia with a high Malay-population, and was of mixed Malay and Tamil descent. He settled in somewhere in modern-day Visayas. Sri Lumay established the Rajahnate of Cebu. His sons also ruled nearby regions and kingdoms.

The name "Visayas" originates from the name "Srivijaya", the name of the aforementioned ancient Malay kingdom of the same that was centered in Sumatra and the Malay Peninsula.

Upon the Islamization of the southern Philippines, Sri Lumay was known to have resisted the Islamic expansion, and enacted a scorched-earth policy for the Moro raiders.

In the 16th century, the Islamization of the Alam Melayu (literally "Malay realm") was near-complete and its influence had spilled into the Philippines. Sharif Kabungsuwan, a native of Johore migrated to Mindanao where he preached Islam to the inland natives - and established the Sultanate of Maguindanao. His descendants provided Mindanao with a fierce resistance to Spanish occupation, one of his descendants, Muhammad Dipaduan Kudarat is known as a national hero in the Philippines.

The late 15th century and through 1521 is filled with preachers of Islam, particularly Malays, along with Arabs, Chinese Muslim and Indian Muslims spreading Islam in the southern Philippines. During the reign of Sultan Bolkiah of Brunei, the Bruneian armies attacked the Kingdom of Tondo and established the Kingdom of Selurong, or Seludong where modern-day Manila is located. This was a Bruneian satellite state, and was placed under the rule of Rajah Sulayman, a native Muslim from the Manila area.

Rajah Sulayman came from a long line of rulers, of mixed Tagalog and Malay descent. His grandfather for example, Salila, was a descendant of the Bolkiah family from Brunei.

In 1521, Ferdinand Magellan arrived in Visayas where he encountered Rajah Humabon, one of Sri Lumay's descendants. Humabon accepted Roman Catholicism, and urged his rival Lapulapu to allow Europeans. Magellan used his Malay servant, Enrique of Malacca to converse with the natives. Magellan and Enrique both perished in the Battle of Mactan.

Pan-Malayan movement
Throughout the 300 years of Spanish colonization, any sort of Malay identity was lost in assimilation, even in the Muslim south where Arabic was the favored and promoted language over Malay. José Rizal, an avid pan-Malayan nationalist spearheaded a movement to "re-unite" the natives of the archipelago with that of its southern neighbors in what would today become the countries of Malaysia, Indonesia, Brunei, Singapore and Thailand.

This type of "Malayan" movement was significantly different than the one that took place in British Malaya and the Dutch East Indies. While those movements were focused on the lone ethnic group originating from Sumatra and the Malay Peninsula, Rizal envisioned a larger pan-Austronesian nation, what would later become coined as the Malay race. Rizal's movement was known as the "Indios Bravos", ("Brave Indians"). Rizal had actually tried to learn Malay, but he was executed in 1896, therefore never getting a chance to fully revive the Malay language in the Philippines.

Wenceslao Vinzons, a Filipino politician and guerrilla leader during World War II, was another noted pan-Malayan nationalist. He found the Perhimpoenan Orang Melayu ("Pan Malay Alliance") at the University of the Philippines.

It is for this reason that definition of "Malay" in the Philippines differ from that of its southern neighbors, therefore making it difficult to get an accurate estimate of who contains descent from the actual ethnic group. As for "Malay race", this would cover approximately 90,000,000 natives in the Philippines.

Religion

Historically, the Malays in the Philippines followed the religious trend of Maritime Southeast Asia. They followed a mix of Animism, Hinduism, Buddhism and Paganism. They introduced cultural influence from the Indian Subcontinent.

In the late 15th century through the 16th century, the Islamisation of the Malay realm also influenced the Philippines, and the Malays introduced Islam. Sharif Kabungsuwan, a Johor-born native of Malay and Arab descent introduced Islam. Rajah Sulayman, the ruler of Seludong, was a Muslim convert.

During the Spanish occupation, the a small minority were converted to Christianity, Roman Catholicism to be specific. Enrique of Malacca, a Malaccan Malay who accompanied the Portuguese conquistador Ferdinand Magellan to Cebu, was a convert to Roman Catholicism, though he wasn't converted in the Philippines and was already a Catholic convert upon arrival. Rajah Humabon, a descendant of Sri Lumay, as well as Lakan Dula of Tondo, both converted to Catholicism and were given the names "Carlos".

Modern misconceptions
It is understood in Indonesia and Malaysia that Malays, as in the ethnic group, are those who speak Malay as a native language.

In Indonesia, Malay and Indonesian are regarded as two different languages. The Malay race, on the other hand, is not the same as the ethnic group, and simply refers to the Austronesian natives of Maritime Southeast Asia. Though the ethnic Malays are part of the bigger Malay race.

In the Philippines, there is misconception and often mixing between the two definitions. Filipinos consider Malays as being the natives of the Philippines, Indonesia, Malaysia and Brunei. Consequently, Filipinos consider themselves Malay when in reality, they are referring to the Malay race. Some Filipinos in Singapore would like to be categorised as Malay, contra Singaporean policy.

This leads to misconceptions about the ancient rulers of the Philippines. Lapulapu for example is sometimes claimed to have been a Malay Muslim, though he was most probably ethnically Cebuano and his religious background most probably animist like his neighboring ruler Rajah Humabon. Though the Bangsamoro follows a Malay-influenced culture, they are also mistakenly called Malays by the majority of Christian Filipinos.

José Rizal, the Philippines' most regarded national hero is often called the "Pride of the Malay Race". The pride of the Malay race, a biography of José Rizal This gave rise to a political concept known as Maphilindo, a proposed confederation that would consist of Philippines, Indonesia and Malaysia. With the creation of ASEAN, this proposal never manifested.

Notable people
Sri Lumay - founder of the Rajahnate of Cebu, was said to have come from Sumatra of Malay descent
Rajah Salila - king of Tondo, descendant of the Bruneian royal family of Bolkiah
Rajah Sulayman - also known as Rajah Sulaiman III, descendant of Salila, of mixed Bruneian and Tagalog descent
Lakan Dula - brother of Rajah Sulayman
Rajah Humabon - descendant of Sri Lumay and rajah of Cebu, made contact with Ferdinand Magellan and embraced Roman Catholicism, of mixed Malay and Cebuano descent
Sharif Kabungsuwan - founder of the Sultanate of Maguindanao, born in Johore of Malay and Arab descent
Muhammad Kudarat - grandson of Kabungsuwan, halted Latinization of Mindanao by Spanish conquerors
Jamalul Kiram III - claimant heir to the Sultanate of Sulu, though the majority of his descent was Tausūg, he claimed to have a common ancestor with Brunei's current sultan Hassanal Bolkiah. This was however been denied by the Bruneian counterparts.

See also
 Ethnic Malays
 Malay language in the Philippines
 Old Malay
 Islam in the Philippines
 Indonesians in the Philippines
 Laguna Copperplate Inscription
 Moro people
 Brunei–Philippines relations
 Indonesia–Philippines relations
 Malaysia–Philippines relations
 Rajahnate of Cebu
 Kingdom of Maynila
 Sultanate of Maguindanao

Sources

Malay people
Asian diaspora in the Philippines